Kathy Jordan and Anne Smith were the defending champions but lost in the final 4–6, 7–5, 6–3 against Martina Navratilova and Pam Shriver.

Seeds
Champion seeds are indicated in bold text while text in italics indicates the round in which those seeds were eliminated.

 Martina Navratilova /  Pam Shriver (champions)
 Kathy Jordan /  Anne Smith (final)
n/a
 Jo Durie /  Barbara Potter (quarterfinals)

Draw

External links
 1983 Virginia Slims of Washington Doubles Draw

Virginia Slims of Washington
1983 Virginia Slims World Championship Series